Cabrich (Scottish Gaelic: Cabarach, meaning "Place of Tree-trunks") is a scattered crofting community in the Highland council area of Scotland. It is 1.5 miles (2.4 km) northeast of the village of Kiltarlity, and around 11 miles (17 km) west of Inverness.

Situated on a gently sloping hill, Cabrich is roughly a mile square and is a popular site for cyclists, runners, and wild-campers. It has a wide variety of wildlife including deer, rabbits, and a large amount of pheasants. Many of its fields are used for sheep-farming.

The area is described in the Aird local walking guide as "a peaceful valley", with no special footwear required.

Populated places in Inverness committee area